Magkaagaw (International title: Broken Faith / ) is a 2019 Philippine drama television series broadcast by GMA Network. The series aired from October 21, 2019 to March 31, 2021 on the network's Afternoon Prime and Sabado Star Power sa Hapon line up and worldwide on GMA Pinoy TV, replacing Hanggang sa Dulo ng Buhay Ko.

Series overview

Episodes

References

Lists of Philippine drama television series episodes